The 2012–13 Liga Națională was the 55th season of Romanian Handball League, the top-level men's professional handball league. The league comprises twelve teams. HCM Constanța were the defending champions, for the fifth time in a row.

Teams

Standings 

Liga Națională (men's handball)
2012 in Romanian sport
2013 in Romanian sport
2012–13 domestic handball leagues